Guido Andreozzi and Guillermo Durán were the defending champions but chose not to defend their title.

Ariel Behar and Gonzalo Escobar won the title after defeating Luis David Martínez and Felipe Meligeni Alves 6–2, 2–6, [10–3] in the final.

Seeds

Draw

References

External links
 Main draw

Lima Challenger - Doubles
2019 Doubles